Martisco is a hamlet in Camillus, New York.  It is the location of the Martisco Station, an historic railway station, and it is the location of the former Martisco bean company.  The Martisco Station was listed on the National Register of Historic Places in 2007.

References

Hamlets in New York (state)
Hamlets in Onondaga County, New York